Elena (or Yelena) Mikhaylovna "Lena" Piskun (born 2 February 1978) is a Belarusian former artistic gymnast who won two World Championship gold medals in the 1990s and competed at the 1996 Summer Olympics.

Personal life
Piskun was born in Minsk, Belarus, in 1978. Her father worked in a tire factory, and her mother was a bookkeeper. She has a younger brother, Viktor. She currently lives in the United States.

Career
Piskun started gymnastics at the age of six and was coached by Valery Kolodinsky during her career. The gym in her hometown of Bobruisk was small, so she traveled to Minsk to train before major competitions.

At the 1993 World Championships in Birmingham, England, Piskun won the gold medal on vault. In April 1994, she competed at the Individual World Championships in Brisbane, Australia, and finished fifth on vault with a score of 9.725 and fifth on floor exercise with a score of 9.675. At the World Championship Team Finals in Dortmund, Germany, in November, Piskun helped the Belarus team to a sixth-place finish. At the 1995 World Championships in Sabae, Japan, she was 10th in the all-around with a score of 38.53.

Piskun finished third on balance beam and eighth on floor exercise at the 1996 European Championships. In April, she competed at the World Championships in San Juan, Puerto Rico, and won a gold medal on uneven bars with a score of 9.787. At that year's Olympic Games in Atlanta, Piskun helped Belarus finish sixth in the team competition, and she was also 12th in the individual all-around with a score of 38.649. At the 1997 World Championships in Lausanne, Switzerland, she finished 30th in the all-around with a score of 35.474.

Piskun owns and coaches at Infinity Gymnastics in Alpharetta, Georgia.

References

1978 births
Living people
Belarusian female artistic gymnasts
Gymnasts at the 1996 Summer Olympics
Olympic gymnasts of Belarus
World champion gymnasts
Medalists at the World Artistic Gymnastics Championships
Gymnasts from Minsk
20th-century Belarusian women